The 2021–22 Birmingham City W.F.C. season was the club's 54th season in existence and their 11th in the FA Women's Super League, the highest level of the football pyramid, having been founding members of the league in 2011. Along with competing in the WSL, the club also contested two domestic cup competitions: the FA Cup and the League Cup.

Ahead of the 2021–22 season the team moved from Damson Park, where they had been based since 2014, to St Andrew's, the club's main stadium.

Manager Carla Ward resigned at the end of the previous campaign after only one season in charge having kept the team up with an 11th-place finish. Ward was replaced by Scott Booth who ended a six-year spell as manager of Glasgow City to take the role. Having only picked up one point from the opening seven league games and losing both League Cup games, Booth was sacked on 18 November 2021 after five months in charge. Tony Elliott took caretaker control for the WSL game against Chelsea on 21 November before Darren Carter was appointed interim manager later that day having left a coaching role at West Bromwich Albion to take the job.

On 4 May 2022, Birmingham City were relegated following a 6–0 defeat away at Manchester City with one game remaining. Members of the WSL since it was founded in 2011, it ended Birmingham's 20-year stint as a top-flight club having last been promoted as 2001–02 FA Women's Premier League Northern Division champions.

Squad

Preseason

FA Women's Super League

Results summary

Results by matchday

Results

League table

Women's FA Cup 

As a member of the first tier, Birmingham City entered the FA Cup in the fourth round proper.

FA Women's League Cup

Group stage

Squad statistics

Appearances 

Starting appearances are listed first, followed by substitute appearances after the + symbol where applicable.

|-
|colspan="14"|Players who appeared for the club but left during the season:

|}

Transfers

Transfers in

Loans in

Transfers out

References 

Birmingham City
Birmingham City L.F.C. seasons